Mir Hasem Ali was a Pakistani politician who was elected as MLA of East Bengal Legislative Assembly in 1954.

References

Pakistani lawyers
Bengali politicians
People from Magura District
Pakistani politicians
Year of birth missing